Kim Pyung-Rae  (Hangul: 김평래; 9 November 1987) is a South Korean football midfielder.

Career 
He started his professional football career in Ukrainian Premier League side FC Metalurh Zaporizhya. Kim made his debut for Metalurh Zaporizhya on 2 August 2009 against Illichivets after coming on as a substitute at the 65 minute.

References

External links 
FC Metalurh Zaporizhya official site profile

 

1987 births
Living people
Association football midfielders
South Korean footballers
South Korean expatriate footballers
FC Metalurh Zaporizhzhia players
Seongnam FC players
Jeonnam Dragons players
K League 1 players
K3 League players
Kim Pyung-rae
Kim Pyung-rae
Ukrainian Premier League players
Expatriate footballers in Ukraine
Expatriate footballers in Thailand
South Korean expatriate sportspeople in Ukraine
South Korean expatriate sportspeople in Thailand
Chung-Ang University alumni